Rodovia Governador Carvalho Pinto (officially designated SP-070) is a highway in the state of São Paulo, Brazil.

It is a continuation of the Rodovia Ayrton Senna (also SP-070), near the city of Guararema and ends by merging with Rodovia Presidente Dutra, which connects the cities of São Paulo and Rio de Janeiro; and Rodovia Floriano Rodrigues Pinheiro (SP-123), which connects Taubaté to Campos do Jordão. In 2018, a branch was added linking it to Rodovia Oswaldo Cruz, which connects Taubaté to Ubatuba The cities served by the highway are Guararema, Jacareí, São José dos Campos, Caçapava and Taubaté.

The highway was built in order to relieve the traffic saturation of the Presidente Dutra Highway, and is the main thoroughfare used by the paulistas who wish to travel to the beaches and cities near the South Atlantic Ocean of the Northern coast of the state (Rodovia dos Tamoios, SP-099), as well as to other cities of the Paraíba River valley, such as Paraibuna and Jambeiro on the plateau of Serra do Mar, and to the mountain resorts in the Mantiqueira mountain range, such as Santo Antonio do Pinhal and Campos do Jordão, via the Rodovia Floriano Rodrigues Pinheiro.

The highway honours one of the former governors of the state of São Paulo, Carlos Alberto Alves de Carvalho Pinto.

It was managed and maintained by DERSA, a state-owned company, until June 18, 2009. Now it's maintained by Ecopistas, but is a toll road.

See also
 Highway system of São Paulo
 Brazilian Highway System

Highways in São Paulo (state)